The Pennsylvania Railroad's class DD2 was a single prototype electric locomotive never placed into series production.
It was intended as an improved and simplified GG1 for use on the planned, but never built, extension of the PRR's electrification west of Harrisburg, Pennsylvania.
The one locomotive produced was numbered #5800 and used in regular Baltimore tunnel helper service until it was scrapped in September 1962.

Design, construction and testing

On May 21, 1937, a meeting was held in Philadelphia to outline the design of a new electric freight locomotive.  The meeting was attended by the PRR and Baldwin, as well as electrical suppliers General Electric and Westinghouse, and the transportation engineering firm Gibbs & Hill, who were consultants on the proposal to extend electrification to Pittsburgh.  The locomotive being designed was what became the DD2.

Technical details

Although the design specified either passenger gearing or freight gearing, the prototype was only ever used with freight gearing.  Its wheel arrangement was 4-4-0+0-4-4 in the Whyte notation, or 2-B+B-2 in the AAR's system.

It had two frames, hinged together in the middle, with the driving wheels and motors mounted directly to each frame, two pairs per side. A swinging four-wheeled, unpowered truck was mounted at the outer end of each frame. The bodywork, mounted above, swivelled on mounts on each of the two main frames. This was an identical layout to the better-known GG1 electric locomotives, but with four driven axles instead of six.

Although it had fewer driven wheels than the GG1, the total power output was slightly greater, thanks to newer and more powerful motors.
compared to the GG1's , meaning that in similar conditions of adhesion the GG1 was slightly at an advantage in terms of applying power to the rail, but the difference was not great.  Styling was also similar to the GG1's.

References 

11 kV AC locomotives
DD2
2-Bo-Bo-2 locomotives
Experimental locomotives
Individual locomotives of the United States
Electric locomotives of the United States
Scrapped locomotives
Unique locomotives
Standard gauge locomotives of the United States
Railway locomotives introduced in 1938
Freight locomotives 
Streamlined electric locomotives